Gawron is a surname. It means "rook" (Corvus frugilegus) in Polish. Notable people with the name include:

 Andrzej Gawron (born 1965), Polish politician, entrepreneur and local official
 Marcin Gawron (born 1988), Polish tennis player
 Paweł Gawron (1921–1983), Polish gymnast

See also
 

Polish-language surnames